The Commander-in-Chief, Plymouth, was a senior commander of the Royal Navy for hundreds of years.  Plymouth Command was a name given to the units, establishments, and staff operating under the admiral's command.  Between 1845 and 1896, this office was renamed  Commander-in-Chief, Devonport. The Commanders-in-Chief were based in what is now Hamoaze House, Devonport, Plymouth, from 1809 to 1934 and then at Admiralty House, Mount Wise, Devonport, from 1934 until 1996.

History

The post dates back to around 1743. It extended along the South Coast from Exmouth in East Devon to Penzance in Cornwall. In 1845, this office was renamed as Commander-in-Chief, Devonport, until 1896, when it was altered back to its original name. In 1941, during World War II, elements of Plymouth Command were transferred to Western Approaches Command which was established at Derby House in Liverpool. Meanwhile, Plymouth Command occupied a new combined Headquarters, known as the Maritime Headquarters, at Mount Wise. The post of Commander-in-Chief, Plymouth, was merged with that of Commander-in-Chief, Portsmouth, in 1969, to form Naval Home Command. Between 1952 and 1969, the Commander-in-Chief, Plymouth, double-hatted as Plymouth Sub-Area Channel Command (PLYMCHAN) commander in NATO's Allied Command Channel, and from 1969 to 1994, he double-hatted as Naval Base Commander Devonport, NATO Commander Central Sub-Area (CENTLANT) and Commander Plymouth Sub-Area Channel (PLYMCHAN).

After 1969, Admiralty House and the Maritime Headquarters became the home of the Flag Officer, Plymouth, until that post was also disbanded in 1996. At around the same time the nearby RN Dockyard and barracks were reconstituted as HM Naval Base Devonport and placed under the command of a Commodore.

Office holders
Commanders-in-Chief and Flag Officers have included:
  = died in post
Jul 1747 – Aug 1747 Rear-Admiral Edward Hawke
Jun 1756 – Jul 1756 Captain George Brydges Rodney
1761 – 1763 Vice-Admiral Philip Durell
Jan 1763 – Jun 1763 Vice-Admiral Lord Colville
1763 – 1766 Vice-Admiral Sir Thomas Pye
1766 – 1770 Vice-Admiral Sir George Edgcumbe
1771 – 1775 Rear-Admiral Sir Richard Spry 
1776 – 1778 Vice-Admiral John Amherst 
1778 – 1783 Vice Admiral Sir Molyneux Shuldham
1783 – 1786 Vice Admiral Mark Milbanke
1786 – 1790 Vice-Admiral Sir Thomas Graves
1790 – 1792 Vice-Admiral Sir Richard Bickerton 
1792 – 1793 Vice-Admiral Phillips Cosby
1794 – 1796 Vice-Admiral Sir Richard King
1796 – 1799 Vice-Admiral Sir Richard Onslow
1799 – 1801 Vice-Admiral Sir Thomas Pasley
1802 – 1803 Vice-Admiral Sir James Dacres
1803 – 1804 Vice-Admiral Sir John Colpoys
1804 – 1810 Vice-Admiral Sir William Young
1810 – 1813 Admiral Sir Robert Calder
1813 – 1815 Admiral Sir William Domett
1815 – 1817 Admiral Sir John Duckworth 
1817 – 1821 Admiral Viscount Exmouth
1821 – 1824 Admiral Sir Alexander Cochrane
1824 – 1827 Admiral Sir James Saumarez
1827 – 1830 Admiral Lord Northesk
1830 – 1833 Admiral Sir Manley Dixon
1833 – 1836 Admiral Sir William Hargood
1836 – 1839 Admiral Lord Amelius Beauclerk
1839 – 1842 Admiral Sir Graham Moore
1842 – 1845 Admiral Sir David Milne 
Office is renamed Commander-in-Chief, Devonport
1900 – 1902 Vice-Admiral Lord Charles Montagu Douglas Scott
1902 – 1908 Vice-Admiral Sir Lewis Beaumont
1908 – 1911 Vice-Admiral Sir Wilmot Fawkes
1911 – 1913 Vice-Admiral Sir William May
1913 – 1916 Vice-Admiral Sir George Egerton
Mar 1916 – Dec 1916 Vice-Admiral Sir George Warrender
1916 – 1918 Admiral Sir Alexander Bethell
1918 – 1920 Vice-Admiral Sir Cecil Thursby
1920 – 1923 Admiral Sir Montague Browning
1923 – 1926 Vice-Admiral Sir Richard Phillimore
1926 – 1929 Vice-Admiral Sir Rudolph Bentinck
1929 – 1932 Vice-Admiral Sir Hubert Brand
1932 – 1935 Vice-Admiral Sir Eric Fullerton
1935 – 1938 Admiral Sir Reginald Drax
1938 – 1941 Admiral Sir Martin Dunbar-Nasmith
1941 – 1943 Admiral of the Fleet Sir Charles Forbes
1943 – 1945 Vice-Admiral Sir Ralph Leatham
1945 – 1947 Admiral Sir Henry Pridham-Wippell
1947 – 1950 Vice-Admiral Sir Robert Burnett
1950 – 1951 Vice-Admiral Sir Rhoderick McGrigor
1951 – 1953 Vice-Admiral Sir Maurice Mansergh
1953 – 1955 Vice-Admiral Sir Alexander Madden
1955 – 1958 Vice Admiral Sir Charles Pizey
1958 – 1961 Vice-Admiral Sir Richard Onslow
1961 – 1962 Vice-Admiral Sir Charles Madden
1962 – 1965 Vice-Admiral Sir Nigel Henderson
1965 – 1967 Vice-Admiral Sir Fitzroy Talbot
1967 – 1969 Vice-Admiral Sir Charles Mills

Post 1969 period
On 30 December 1970, Vice-Admiral J R McKaig CBE was appointed as Port Admiral, Her Majesty's Naval Base, Devonport, and Flag Officer, Plymouth. On 5 September 1971, all Flag Officers of the Royal Navy holding positions of Admiral Superintendents at Royal Dockyards were restyled as Port Admirals.

See also
 Commander-in-Chief, Devonport
 Flag Officer, Plymouth
 Port Admiral, Devonport

References

P
Military units and formations disestablished in 1969
Military units and formations of the Royal Navy in World War I
Military units and formations of the Royal Navy in World War II
Military history of the English Channel